The Dudek Vox is a Polish single-place, paraglider that was designed and produced by Dudek Paragliding of Bydgoszcz. It is now out of production.

Design and development
The Vox was designed as an intermediate glider for cross-country flying and made from Skytex material with Technora lines. It was developed from the Dudek Vip and replaced it in the company's product line. The Vox has been tested for and found suitable for both towing and powered paragliding. The models are each named for their approximate wing area in square metres.

Operational history
Reviewer Noel Bertrand described the Vox in a 2003 review as "technically very elaborate".

Łukasz Chyla, a 16-year old Dudek Team pilot completed a 51-km Fédération Aéronautique Internationale triangle course the day after the Vox was granted its AFNOR Standard certificate.

Variants
Vox 25
Small-sized model for lightweight pilots. The glider model is AFNOR Standard certified.
Vox 27
Mid-sized model for medium weight pilots. The glider model is AFNOR Standard certified.
Vox 29
Large-sized model for heavier pilots. The glider model is AFNOR Standard certified.

Specifications (Vox 27)

References

External links

Vox
Paragliders